The Battle of Chelenqo (also spelled Chalanko, Chalenko, Calanqo, Calanko, Chelenko, etc.) was an engagement fought on 9 January 1887 between the army of Shewa under Negus Menelik and Emir 'Abd Allah II ibn 'Ali 'Abd ash-Shakur of Harar. The Harari forces were routed, and Negus Menelik afterwards occupied and annexed the city of Harar.

Background
Negus Menelik, in response to Italian control of parts of Eritrea and the port of Massawa, had begun to import firearms and munitions through the French-controlled ports of Djibouti. By 1886, Emir 'Abd Allah of Harar had blocked transport of these arms through his territories.

The massacre of the Italian explorer Count Pietro Porro and his entire party in April 1886, allegedly at the emir's command, gave the Negus an excuse to march on Harar.
Menelik had desired control of the city of Harar for some time. Although the army of Shewa was a veteran force with contemporary rifles, and numbered in the thousands, Negus Menelik sought to avoid war, and in January 1887, offered 'Abd Allah the same kind of autonomy that Abba Jifar II of the Kingdom of Jimma enjoyed; the Emir refused this offer.

Prelude
A year before the battle of Chelenqo near Hirna, a few troops led by Menelik's general made an attempt to invade Harar. Menelik's informant Asme Giyorgis, conceded the initial push towards Harar by Walda Gabryiel was a failure as the Amir's soldiers used fireworks to startle his men, forcing a retreat. According to Harari accounts, Walda Gabryiel's army were strategically pushed into a corn field full of spikes which pierced their feet, immobilizing them.

Battle
Knowing that he was heavily outnumbered, and his troops had only obsolete matchlocks and a few cannons, Emir 'Abd Allah decided to attack on early in the morning of Ethiopian Christmas (January 9), expecting the Shewans to be unprepared and befuddled with food and alcohol. However, Negus Menelik was worried about a surprise attack, and kept his men at alert.

The Emir's men opened fire at 11:00 am. The Shewan soldiers quickly took the advantage and Makonnen's column destroyed the enemy artillery; within twenty minutes, Menelik's troops were victorious. Menelik pursued the retreating emir to Harar, whose ancient walls would not long resist his assault. Once again 'Abd Allah refused to surrender, then fled into the desert, leaving his uncle to negotiate the city's surrender. With the occupation, the independence of Harar came to an end.

Consequences
Finally having conquered Harar, Menelik extended trade routes through the city, importing valuable goods such as arms, and exporting other valuables such as coffee. He would place his cousin, Makonnen Wolde Mikael in control of the city.

See also
Battle of Embabo
Harar
Harari People
Ittu Oromo
Arthur Rimbaud

References 

1887 in Ethiopia
Battles involving Ethiopia
Conflicts in 1887
January 1887 events
Menelik's Expansion Campaigns